Lord's Bridge was a railway station on the Varsity Line which ran between Oxford and Cambridge. Situated in the north of the parish of Harlton on the western outskirts of Cambridge, it was the penultimate station before the line's eastern terminus at Cambridge. The station opened in 1862 and closed more than a century later in 1968. The site is now part of the Mullard Radio Astronomy Observatory, which includes several rail-mounted radio-telescopes.

History 

As with the neighbouring Old North Road station, Lord's Bridge was built in open country. It was principally a stop for the local Lord of the Manor. The station's platforms were lengthened on 17 July 1907 to accommodate the longer trains running on the line.

The station was equipped with a LNWR type 4 signal box from which a key could be obtained to unlock the Toft & Kingston siding to the west which handled sugar beet and hay traffic. The traffic through Lord's Bridge was to change during the Second World War when a large ammunition store was built up at the station which brought many new workings to the line including an ex-Midland 2F tank locomotive which was kept permanently there for the purposes of shunting each train into the depot as they arrived and preparing the empties for return. The site included a Forward Filling Depot, FFD4, where bulk mustard gas from M. S. Factory, Valley was used to fill bombs and shells.

Present day 

Following closure of the line between Bedford and Cambridge on New Year's Eve 1967, a section from Lord's Bridge station towards Cambridge became part of the University of Cambridge's Mullard Radio Astronomy Observatory, which had opened in 1957 on a site to the south of the station. This allowed the construction of the rail-mounted Ryle radio telescope array, moving along a 4.8 km length of track of approximately 20 ft gauge.

The goods shed remains as does a single length of the eastbound platform.

See also
 Beeching Axe

References

External links
 Lord's Bridge station on navigable 1946 O. S. map
 

Disused railway stations in Cambridgeshire
Former London and North Western Railway stations
Railway stations in Great Britain opened in 1862
Railway stations in Great Britain closed in 1968
1862 establishments in England